Hugo Moura Arruda da Silva (born 3 January 1998), is a Brazilian professional footballer who plays as a defensive midfielder for Campeonato Brasileiro Série A Club Athletico Paranaense.

Club career

Flamengo
Born in Rio de Janeiro, Moura joined the youth setup of Flamengo at the age of 12. In 2016, he suffered an injury and was ruled out of Copa São Paulo de Futebol Júnior. On 17 January 2018, he made his first team debut in a 2–0 win against Volta Redonda, in Campeonato Carioca. Eight days later, he captained the under-20 team to their Copa São Paulo de Futebol Júnior final victory against São Paulo.

On 23 November 2018, Moura was promoted to the senior team for the upcoming season. On 3 September 2019, Flamengo extended contract with Moura until December 2023.

On 5 May 2019 Moura played his first Campeonato Brasileiro Série A match at Morumbi Stadium against São Paulo, he started the match as head coach Abel Braga fielded the whole team with reserves, the match ended 1–1.

Loan to Coritiba
On 31 August 2020, Moura transferred to Coritiba on loan until the end of the 2020 Campeonato Brasileiro Série A.

Loan to Lugano
On 25 August 2021, Swiss club Lugano announced that they are forced to terminate Moura's loan that was arranged a month earlier due to failing Swiss Super League regulations.

Athletico Paranaense
On 5 January 2022, Moura moved to Athletico Paranaense on a one year loan until 31 December 2022 with a option to buy clause. On 19 July, Athletico exercised his buyout clause and agreed to pay a €1.2m fee to retain his services.

Career statistics

Honours
Flamengo
Copa Libertadores: 2019
Recopa Sudamericana: 2020
Campeonato Brasileiro Série A: 2019
Supercopa do Brasil: 2020, 2021
Campeonato Carioca: 2019, 2020, 2021

References

External links
Flamengo profile 

1998 births
Living people
Association football midfielders
Brazilian footballers
Campeonato Brasileiro Série A players
Swiss Super League players
CR Flamengo footballers
Coritiba Foot Ball Club players
Club Athletico Paranaense players
FC Lugano players
Brazilian expatriate footballers
Brazilian expatriate sportspeople in Switzerland
Expatriate footballers in Switzerland